Jessica Allen (born 21 August 1989) is a Welsh racing cyclist. 

She was born in Brecon After being spotted by the Welsh Talent Team, she was selected for the Olympic Development Programme in 2006. She was British Junior Time Trial Champion in 2006 and later British Junior Points Race and Time Trial Champion in 2007. She was a 1st category rider and was in 2008 ranked fifth in the UK.

Palmarès 

2006
 1st  British National Time Trial Championships – Junior
 2nd Welsh National Road Race Championships

2007
 1st  Points Race British National Track Championships – Junior
 1st  British National Time Trial Championships – Junior

2008
 4th British National Road Race Championships
 2nd U23 British National Road Race Championships

References

External links 
 British Cycling: Team Halfords-Bikehut Launched – 9 January 2007 – London

1989 births
Living people
Welsh female cyclists
Sportspeople from Brecon